Dufferin is a rural municipality in the province of Manitoba in Western Canada. The separately administered town of Carman lies near its centre.

The R.M. was named after Frederick Hamilton-Temple-Blackwood, 1st Marquess of Dufferin and Ava who was Governor General of Canada (1872–78). The now rural municipality was described as a new settlement in 1874.

Communities
 Barnsley
 Graysville
 Homewood
 Roseisle
 Stephenfield

Demographics 

References 

 Manitoba Historical Society - Rural Municipality of Dufferin
 Map of Dufferin R.M. at Statcan

External links
 
 Carman/Dufferin Heritage Advisory Committee

Dufferin